Palletoori Bava is a 1973 Telugu-language drama film, produced by A. V. Subba Rao under the Prasad Art Productions banner and directed by K. Pratyagatma. It stars Akkineni Nageshwara Rao and Lakshmi, with music composed by T. Chalapathi Rao. The film is a remake of the Tamil film Pattikada Pattanama (1972). The film was remade in Kannada as Putnanja (1995) and in Hindi as Banarasi Babu (1997).

Plot
The film begins with Eedukondalu (Akkineni Nageshwara Rao), a young and energetic guy and Zamindar of a village, Seetapuram, who is held in high esteem by the villagers. Lalitha (Lakshmi), foreign-returned English rose is his maternal uncle Bheema Rao's (Nagabhushanam) daughter. Once Bheema Rao visits Seetapuram along with his family where Lalitha is fascinated by Eedukondalu's prowess. Knowing it, Deepa Lakshmi (Sukumari) a shrewish and arrogant wife of Bheema Rao forcibly tries to couple up Lalitha with her nephew Madhu (Chandra Mohan), a debauched person. So, Bheema Rao seeks Eedukondalu's help when he gamely elopes with Lalitha from the venue and they are married. Soon after the marriage, small disputes and differences arise between the couple as Lalitha is unable to tune in to the village atmosphere. Here Eedukondalu tries to alter his beloved's behavior with goodness. Meanwhile, on the occasion of Lalitha's birthday, she goes carousing with her Hippie friends when one of the men tries to molest Eedukondalu's niece Rangi (Shubha). Spotting it, furious Eedukondalu smacks everyone including Lalitha. Thereafter, egotistical Lalitha leaves to her mother, who sends a divorce notice to Eedukondalu. Now he decides to get her back, by teaching a lesson and succeeds in making her pregnant. After conceiving, Deepa Lakshmi discards the child in an orphanage and Lalitha gets shocked by her mother's deed. By the time she goes to recovery, Eedukondalu walks away with the child. At present, Eedukondalu threatens Lalitha by announcing his remarriage with Rangi. During the time of the wedding, Lalitha appears, pleads pardon and wants her husband and child back. At last, Eedukondalu avows all this was his play. Finally, the movie ends on a happy note on the reunion of Eedukondalu and Lalitha.

Cast
Akkineni Nageshwara Rao as Eedukondalu
Lakshmi as Lalitha
Chandra Mohan as Madhu
Nagabhushanam as Bheema Rao
Relangi as Lawyer Bhajagovindam
Ramana Reddy as Kotaiah
Raja Babu as Minor Babu
Gokina Rama Rao as Edukondalu's uncle
Mada as butler
Chitti Babu as rickshaw puller
Sarathi as Dosakaya
Rama Prabha as Chittamma
Shubha as Rangamma
Sukumari as Deepalakshmi
Nirmalamma as Edukondalu's grandmother

Soundtrack

Music composed by Chakravarthy. Lyrics were written by Veturi.

References

Indian drama films
Films scored by T. Chalapathi Rao
Indian black-and-white films
Telugu remakes of Tamil films
Films directed by Kotayya Pratyagatma